Damond L. Williams (born October 10, 1980) is an American professional basketball player in the International Basketball Federation (FIBA) Asia League.  Williams, who is  6'6", is known for his versatility as a combo guard, effective at playing both point guard and shooting guard positions. He led his team through a perfect season of 42-0 during the Syrian Premier League and Syrian League Cup in the 2009 season. In 2009 Damond was voted the best shooting guard of the 20th Dubai International Basketball Tournament. Damond is also Founder of the Chicago Basketball Academy a global company that creates high-quality programs and services to provide alternative career opportunities for aspiring NCAA, NBA, and FIBA athletes.

Early life and youth
Damond L. Williams was born on Chicago's southeast side.  He attended the esteemed Hyde Park Career Academy where he was a constant honor role student-athlete. Damond earned All-City accolades in cross country, but excelled in basketball as he often won slam-dunk contests and proved to be a prolific scorer. He received a full-athletic scholarship to New Mexico State University in 1997 when he was 17.

College career

Damond earned great athletic notoriety having played for a number of NCAA Division 1 schools under a full athletic scholarship University of Memphis, and New Mexico State before finding a permanent role on the McNeese State University Men's Basketball team, where he was the Lake Charles Toyota 2003 McNeese State University MVP. In 50 games with the McNeese State Cowboys, Damond established himself as a standout student-athlete and earned a bachelor's degree in Social Sciences. Heralded for his brilliant all-around game and explosive play style, Damond played a pivotal role in McNeese State's sharp rise to the top of the Southland Conference and the 2002 NCAA Tournament where he was named Chevrolet MVP of the 1st-round game against Mississippi State University.

Professional career

Ireland
Williams started his professional career in Ireland with the Tralee Tigers of the Premier League during the 2003–04 season, helping the team win the championship.

United States
Williams played in the United States Basketball League for the Cedar Rapids River Raiders during the 2004–2005 season. Williams later played in the Continental Basketball Association league, playing for the Dakota Wizards during the 2005–2006 seasons. Shortly after, Williams was drafted to play in Argentina and upon his return to the U.S., he was drafted into the NBA Development League to play for the Los Angeles D-Fenders. However, Williams instead choose to accept an offer to compete internationally for the top basketball league in Syria. Williams also played in exhibition games for the world-famous Harlem Globetrotters in 2004 and 2007.

Latin America
In 2007, Williams joined the Argentine LNB League team Boca Juniors (basketball), where he led his team to win Copa Argentina de Básquetbol Argentina Cup at the National Level, and  Campeonato Sudamericano de Clubes at the International Level. Within the LNB, Williams would later play for multiple teams, including: Reales de La Vega, Titanes Del Distrito Nacional, Mineros de Cananea  and Huracanes del Atlantico.

West Asia
In 2007, Williams joined the Syrian Basketball League, playing for 3 teams from 2007 - 2010:  Al-Jaish SC (Damascus), Al-Ittihad SC Aleppo, and Jalaa SC (men's basketball). While playing in the Syrian Premier League, Williams won several titles in the Syrian League and in the Syrian League, Hoops Club and the Dubai International Basketball Tournament.

Professional career statistics

Professional career

|-
| align="left" | 2003-04
| align="left" | Tralee Tigers
| 11 || 11 || 38 || 53.4 || 38.7 || 78.9 || 9.2 || 2.5 || 1.2 || .7 || 19.5
|-
| align="left" | 2004-04
| align="left" | Cedar Rapids River Raiders
| 5 || 1 || 9 || 52.5 || 39.4 || 81.8 || 1.4 || 1.6 || 1.1 || 1.2 || 4.0
|-
| align="left" | 2005–05
| align="left" | Soles de Mexicali
| 7 || 7 || 37 || 56.8 || 39.7 || 77.3 || 7.0 || 5.4 || 1.3 || 1.7 || 28.4
|-
| align="left" | 2005–06
| align="left" | Dakota Wizards
| 34 || 5 || 24 || 54.9 || 18.8 || 60.9 || 3.5 || 1.1 || 1.1 || .8 || 8.3
|-
| align="left" | 2006–07
| align="left" | Boca Juniors (basketball)
| 10 || 10 || 35 || 55.5 || 38.8 || 74.7 || 6.7 || 3.9 || 1.2 || 1.5 || 18.9
|-
| align="left" | 2007–07
| align="left" | Calor de Mexicali
| 12 || 12 || 37 || 53.6 || 41.2 || 77.3 || 7.9 || 3.2 || 2.3 || 1.4 || 32.1
|-
| align="left" | 2007–08
| align="left" | Al-Jaish SC (Damascus)
| 27 || 27 || 36 || 59.0 || 40.7 || 79.6 || 7.3 || 3.4 || 1.8 || .9 || 28.6
|-
| align="left" | 2008–08
| align="left" | Reales de La Vega
| 8 || 8 || 35 || 56.2 || 41.4 || 79.7 || 6.7 || 2.7 || 1.4 || 1.3 || 24.7
|-
| align="left" | 2008–09
| align="left" | Jalaa SC (men's basketball)
| 32 || 32 || 27 || 58.3 || 42.5 || 76.2 || 5.8 || 4.9 || 1.9 || 1.1 || 17.6
|-
| align="left" | 2009–10
| align="left" | Al-Ittihad SC Aleppo
| 27 || 27 || 38 || 58.9 || 42.5 || 78.6|| 7.4 || 5.7 || 1.7 || 1.6 || 27.4
|-
| align="left" | 2010–10
| align="left" | Titanes Del Distrito Nacional
| 8 || 8 || 35 || 53.8 || 41.8 || 77.3 || 6.5 || 3.8 || 1.3 || .8 || 24.8
|-
| align="left" | 2011–11
| align="left" | Mineros de Cananea
| 8 || 8 || 31 || 57.5 || 30.0 || 74.2 || 4.1 || 1.8 || 1.4 || 1.0 || 15.6
|-
| align="left" | 2012–12
| align="left" | Hoops Club
| 12 || 12 || 38 || 57.9 || 21.8 || 59.9 || 7.6 || 5.6 || 2.3 || 1.6 || 21.4
|-
| align="left" | 2013–13
| align="left" | Mineros de Cananea
| 10 || 10 || 29 || 64.4 || 20.0 || 81.0 || 2.8 || 4.8 || 2.6 || 0.8 || 16.3
|-
| align="left" | Career
| align="left" | 
| 189 || 185 || -- || -- || -- || -- || -- || -- || -- || -- || --

College career

|-
| align="left" | 2001-02
| align="left" | McNeese State University
| 21 || 21 || 34 || 51.2 || 38.1 || 61.8 || 5.5 || 1.4 || 1.8 || .7 || 11.4
|-
| align="left" | 2002-03
| align="left" | McNeese State University
| 29 || 27 || 35 || 46.7 || 29.9 || 54.2 || 6.3 || 2.4 || 1.7 || 1.3 || 10.7
|-
| align="left" | Career
| align="left" | 
| 50 || 48 || -- || -- || -- || -- || -- || -- || -- || -- || --

Awards and accomplishments

Pro career
 2007 Liga Profesional de Baloncesto Regular Season Finalist -   
 2007 Circuito de Baloncesto de la Costa del Pacífico All Star Game 
 2007 Copa Argentina de Básquetbol Champion:  
 2007 Campeonato Sudamericano de Clubes Finalist:  
 2008 Syrian Premier League MVP
 2008 Jalaa SC (men's basketball)  
 2009 Jalaa SC (men's basketball) Champion 
 2009 Jalaa SC (men's basketball) Syrian Premier League Champion 
 2009 Jalaa SC (men's basketball) Syrian Cup Winner Champion 
 2009 Jalaa SC (men's basketball) Aleppo International Tournament Champion 
 2009 Dubai International Tournament 
 2009 Best Shooting Guard Dubai International Tournament
 2010 Syrian Basketball Cup  
 2010 Asia-Basket.com All-Syrian League Honorable Mention
 2012 All-Lebanon League Honorable Mention

College career 
 2002 Chevrolet McNeese State University MVP
 2002 Southland Conference tournament Winner 
 2002 Southland Conference Regular Season champion 
 2002 All-Southland Conference 
 2003 Toyota Lake Charles McNeese State University MVP
 2003 Southland Conf. Tournament semifinals

External links
 Eurobasket.com Profile
 Asiabasket.com Profile

References

1980 births
Living people
Basketball players from Chicago
Dakota Wizards players
Los Angeles D-Fenders players
McNeese Cowboys basketball players
New Mexico State Aggies men's basketball players
American men's basketball players
Huracanes del Atlántico players
Guards (basketball)